5W or 5-W may refer to:

Units of measurement
5°W, or 5th meridian west, a line of longitude
5 watts
5 weeks
5 wins, abbreviated in a win–loss record (pitching)

Science, technology and transportation
5w, a viscosity grade of motor oil
I-5W, westbound Interstate 5
Interstate 5 in California
AD-5W, a version of the Douglas A-1 Skyraider
5W, IATA airline code for Astraeus Airlines

Other uses
 Five Ws: Who?, What?, When?, Where?, and Why?
 "Which Was What Was Wanted", an alternative to Q.E.D.
5W Public Relations, a public relations agency
5W, production code for the 1982 Doctor Who serial Four to Doomsday

See also

W5 (disambiguation)